Mount Olive Cathedral is a Christian Methodist Episcopal cathedral in Memphis, Tennessee, United States of America.  It is located on the corners of Linden Avenue and Lauderdale Street. The Reverend Dr. Stevey M. Wilburn is the current minister of the cathedral.

History
Mt. Olive Cathedral originally started as a church in the Jug Factory on the corner of South Orleans and Georgia Avenue in Memphis, Tennessee.  As the congregation grew, the church moved into a building they had rented, and from there a brick church was built on Georgia Avenue.  In 1952, the church moved to its current place, and became a cathedral.  This building was designed by R. H. Hunt for First Baptist Church in 1907. When the white Baptist congregation sold the building to the African American CME one, the cooperation of the segregated churches was reported in an article in the New York Times.

References

Methodist cathedrals in the United States
20th-century Methodist church buildings
Churches in Memphis, Tennessee
Christian Methodist Episcopal churches in Tennessee